WSIB may refer to:

 Workplace Safety & Insurance Board, worker's compensation insurer in Ontario, Canada
 WWGM, a radio station (93.9 FM) licensed to Selmer, Tennessee, United States, which held the call sign WSIB from 1989 to 2018